Yang Wanshun (born 16 January 1996) is a Chinese footballer who currently plays for China League Two side Ji'nan Xingzhou.

Club career
Yang Wanshun started his professional football career in 2015 when he was promoted to China League One side Tianjin Songjiang's first team squad. On 4 April 2015, he made his senior debut in a 2–0 away defeat against Hunan Billows, coming on as a substitute for Zhang Cheng in the 78th minute. Although making eight appearances for the club in the first half of the season, he was degraded to the reserve team in July 2015.

Yang joined China League Two side Yancheng Dingli along with teammate Yang Fan in 2016 season. He made a permanent transfer to Yancheng Dingli in 2017 after promising performances in the 2016 season, scoring seven goals in 20 appearances. Yang transferred to Chinese Super League side Guangzhou R&F in July 2017.

On 28 February 2018, Yang transferred to fellow top tier club Tianjin TEDA after a successful trial. He made his debut for the club on 3 March 2018 in a 1–1 home draw against Hebei China Fortune, coming on for Li Yuanyi in the 90th minute.

Career statistics
.

References

External links
 

1996 births
Living people
Chinese footballers
Sportspeople from Jinan
Footballers from Shandong
Tianjin Tianhai F.C. players
Guangzhou City F.C. players
Tianjin Jinmen Tiger F.C. players
Chinese Super League players
China League One players
China League Two players
Association football midfielders